The seventh season of M*A*S*H aired Mondays at 9:00–9:30 pm on CBS.

Cast

Episodes

Notes

References

External links 
 List of M*A*S*H (season 7) episodes at the Internet Movie Database

1978 American television seasons
1979 American television seasons
MASH 07